Rainbow Party may refer to:

 Green-Rainbow Party, of Massachusetts, a US political party
 Rainbow (Greece), a regionalist political party in Greece
Rainbow Party, a socialist Zambian political party
 Rainbow party (sexuality), urban legend
 Rainbow Party (novel), the 2005 Paul Ruditis novel about such parties.

See also
 Rainbow Coalition (disambiguation)